A magnetic switchable device (often called a magnetic base) is a magnetic fixture that uses one or more permanent magnets in a configuration that allows the external field to be turned on or off. They are used in many applications including optics, metalworking, lifting, and robotics, to attach items to metal surfaces in a secure but temporary way.

The magnetic base may have a V cut into the bottom of the base or the back. This V allows the base to be attached to a round bar such as the column of a drill press or a pipe.

One type of magnetic switchable device is made from two blocks of iron, with a round cavity bored through the centre. The halves are joined together with a non-ferrous material such as brass or aluminium.  A round permanent magnet is inserted into the bored hole and a handle is attached to allow rotation of the magnet. This act of rotation changes the orientation of the magnetic field.

In the off position,  the poles are oriented towards the non-ferrous core.  The iron blocks act as keepers by bridging between both poles.

In the on position, the poles are each in one iron half, which then acts as an extension. The field is effectively passing across an air gap (at the base and top). If this gap is bridged with a piece of iron, it becomes part of the magnetic circuit and will be attracted with the full strength of the magnet.

A magnetic base can therefore be attached in a variety of positions to any ferrous surface, allowing the base to be positioned in the desired orientation. 

An alternative to the post and swiveling connectors is an arrangement whereby a series of interconnecting swivels can be set in position by tightening or loosening a central member. This member may be made from wire rope as it has to be extremely flexible yet strong in tension, the possibilities for positioning this type is probably no more than the two post type but its advantage lies in the fact that there is only one mechanism (screw) to loosen or tighten the arrangement making it easier to use.

References

Magnetic devices
Metalworking hand tools